Sok Kwu Wan Pier No. 2 is a public pier located adjacent to Sok Kwu Wan Public Pier on the waterfront of Sok Kwu Wan in Sok Kwu Wan First Street, Lamma Island, Hong Kong. There is only one ferry service provided in the pier, which is the service between Sok Kwu Wan and Central, operated by Hong Kong & Kowloon Ferry.

History
In the early days, the Hongkong and Yaumati Ferry’s ferries, licensed ferries, kaito and private yachts shared the Sok Kwu Wan Public Pier. As Sok Kwu Wan has become a popular tourist spot for local and overseas tourists, the pier is very crowded. In addition, due to its proximity to Aberdeen, it also attracts a large number of yachts, especially on weekends and public holidays. Residents in the area and the Hongkong and Yaumati Ferry have repeatedly complained about the congestion of the pier and insufficient berthing facilities. It is common for ships to berth in two rows. After reviewing the above situation, the Commissioner for Transport believes that it is necessary to increase berthing facilities to relieve congestion and improve safety.

In 1994 and 1995, the authorities planned to build new piers to provide berthing and landing facilities for the Hongkong and Yaumati Ferry and the public.

The construction of the pier started in February 1996 at a cost of HK$28 million. The pier opened on 4 March 1998, and the opening ceremony was officiated by the Director of Civil Engineering, Bernard Lam Moon-tim.

References

1998 establishments in Hong Kong
Piers in Hong Kong
Lamma Island
Transport infrastructure completed in 1998